Robert Weir may refer to:

Robert Weir (politician) (1882–1939), Canadian politician
Robert Walter Weir (1803–1889), American artist
Robert Weir (athlete) (born 1961), English discus thrower
Robert Stanley Weir (1856–1926), Canadian judge and poet
Bob Weir (born 1947), American singer, songwriter, and guitarist with the Grateful Dead
 Robbie Weir (born 1988), Northern Irish footballer

See also
Robert E. Wier (born 1967), American judge